Associazione Calcio Fiorentina came off second best in a competitive battle for fourth in Serie A. Under Alberto Malesani's leadership, Fiorentina played an attacking 3–5–2 formation, where goal scoring duo Gabriel Batistuta and Luís Oliveira scored an accumulated 36 goals between them. Following the end of the season, Malesani accepted an offer from Parma, thus departing the club after only one season in charge. Sensationally, Giovanni Trapattoni became his successor, remarking that Fiorentina was serious about winning the league.

Players

Transfers

Winter

Competitions

Serie A

League table

Results summary

Results by round

Matches

Coppa Italia

Quarter-finals

Statistics

Appearances and goals

Goalscorers
  Gabriel Batistuta 21
  Luís Oliveira 14 (1)
  Domenico Morfeo 5 (1)
  Edmundo 4
  Anselmo Robbiati 4
  Rui Costa 4

References

ACF Fiorentina seasons
Fiorentina